Torkabad or Tarkabad, also rendered as Turkabad, may refer to:
 Torkabad, Kerman
 Torkabad, Yazd